Spring Township is the name of some places in the U.S. state of Pennsylvania:

Spring Township, Berks County, Pennsylvania
Spring Township, Centre County, Pennsylvania
Spring Township, Crawford County, Pennsylvania
Spring Township, Perry County, Pennsylvania
Spring Township, Snyder County, Pennsylvania

Pennsylvania township disambiguation pages